Count Claude d'Aspremont Lynden is a Belgian economist and professor at the Universite Catholique de Louvain, Center for Operations Research and Econometrics (CORE), and Département des sciences économiques (ECON). He obtained a PhD (dissertation in decision sciences) at the Graduate School of Business, Stanford University (United States) in 1973. His research focus is mathematical economics, social choice theory, and industrial organization. In 1995, he was awarded the Francqui Prize in Human Sciences.

External links
 Claude d'Aspremont Lynden

Belgian economists
Walloon people
Stanford Graduate School of Business alumni
Academic staff of the Université catholique de Louvain
Living people
Counts of Belgium
Fellows of the Econometric Society
Year of birth missing (living people)